Gülzow is a town in Lauenburg district in Schleswig-Holstein, Germany, founded in the 13th century.

It has a population of 1,500 and is situated near Hamburg, between Lauenburg, Geesthacht and Schwarzenbek. There is a market square, where fresh fruit, vegetables and other things can be bought. In the square there is also a café and a small museum of local history.

References

Herzogtum Lauenburg